Foltmar is a surname. Notable people with the surname include: 

Christian Ulrik Foltmar (1716–1794), Danish wallpaper weaver, painter, and organist
Christoffer Foltmar (1718–1759), Danish painter and organist, brother of Christian and Johan
Johan Foltmar (1714–1794), Danish composer